The following is the list of squads that took part in the men's water polo tournament at the 1968 Summer Olympics.

Brazil
The following players represented Brazil:

 Ivo Carotini
 Marc de Vicoso
 Henrique Filellini
 João Gonçalves Filho
 Cláudio Lima
 Aluísio Marsili
 Arnaldo Marsili
 Pedro Pinciroli Júnior
 Alvaro Pires
 Fernando Sandoval

Cuba
The following players represented Cuba:

 Oscar Periche
 Waldimiro Arcos
 Miguel García
 Rolando Valdés
 Rubén Junco
 Guillermo Martínez Ginoris
 Chepe Rodríguez
 Osvaldo García
 Roberto Rodríguez
 Guillermo Cañete
 Jesús Pérez

East Germany
The following players represented East Germany:

 Hans-Georg Fehn
 Klaus Schlenkrich
 Jürgen Thiel
 Siegfried Ballerstedt
 Peter Rund
 Hans-Jürgen Schüler
 Jürgen Kluge
 Veit Herrmanns
 Manfred Herzog
 Hans-Ulrich Lange
 Peter Schmidt

Egypt
The following players represented Egypt:

 Mohamed Abid Soliman
 Salah El-Din Shalabi
 Mohamed El-Bassiouni
 Sameh Soliman
 Galal Touny
 Adel El-Moalem
 Alaa El-Din El-Shafei
 Khaled El-Kashef
 Hossam El-Baroudi
 Haroun Touny
 Ashraf Gamil

Greece
The following players represented Greece:

 Ioannis Thymaras
 Georgios Theodorakopoulos
 Kyriakos Iosifidis
 Andreas Garyfallos
 Dimitrios Kougevetopoulos
 Panagiotis Mathioudakis
 Ioannis Palios
 Georgios Palikaris
 Nikolaos Tsangas
 Thomas Karalogos
 Panagiotis Mikhalos

Hungary
The following players represented Hungary:

 Endre Molnár
 Mihály Mayer
 István Szivós Jr.
 János Konrád
 László Sárosi
 László Felkai
 Ferenc Konrád
 Dénes Pócsik
 András Bodnár
 Zoltán Dömötör
 János Steinmetz

Italy
The following players represented Italy:

 Alberto Alberani Samaritani
 Eraldo Pizzo
 Mario Cevasco
 Gianni Lonzi
 Enzo Barlocco
 Franco Lavoratori
 Gianni De Magistris
 Alessandro Ghibellini
 Giancarlo Guerrini
 Paolo Ferrando
 Eugenio Merello

Japan
The following players represented Japan:

 Tetsunosuke Ishii
 Hirokatsu Kuwayama
 Koji Nakano
 Shuzo Yajima
 Shigeharu Kuwabara
 Haruo Sato
 Kazuya Takeuchi
 Kunio Yonehara
 Seiya Sakamoto

Mexico
The following players represented Mexico:

 Oscar Familiar
 Rolando Chávez
 Francisco García
 Germán Chávez
 Carlos Morfín
 Luis Guzmán
 Virgilio Botella
 Juan Manuel García
 José Luis Vásquez
 Sergio Ramos
 Daniel Gómez

Netherlands
The following players represented the Netherlands:

 Feike de Vries
 Hans Wouda
 Loet Geutjes
 Hans Hoogveld
 Fred van Dorp
 Hans Parrel
 Nico van der Voet
 Ad Moolhuijzen
 Bart Bongers
 André Hermsen
 Evert Kroon

Soviet Union
The following players represented the Soviet Union:

 Vadim Gulyayev
 Givi Chikvanaia
 Boris Grishin
 Aleksandr Dolgushin
 Oleksiy Barkalov
 Yury Grigorovsky
 Vladimir Semyonov
 Aleksandr Shidlovsky
 Vyacheslav Skok
 Leonid Osipov
 Oleg Bovin

Spain
The following players represented Spain:

 Luis Bestit
 Jorge Borell
 Juan Rubio
 José Padrós
 Agustín Codera
 Fermín Más
 Lolo Ibern
 Santiago Zubicoa
 Luis Meya
 Juan Jané
 Vicente Brugat

United States
The following players represented the United States:

 Tony van Dorp
 Dave Ashleigh
 Russ Webb
 Ron Crawford
 Stan Cole
 Bruce Bradley
 Dean Willeford
 Barry Weitzenberg
 Gary Sheerer
 John Parker
 Steve Barnett

West Germany
The following players represented West Germany:

 Hans Hoffmeister
 Hermann Haverkamp
 Peter Teicher
 Lajos Nagy
 Wolf-Rüdiger Schulz
 Ludger Weeke
 Dietmar Seiz
 Kurt Schuhmann
 Heinz Kleimeier
 Ludwig Ott
 Günter Kilian

Yugoslavia
The following players represented Yugoslavia:

 Ivo Trumbić
 Karlo Stipanić
 Ozren Bonačić
 Zoran Janković
 Uroš Marović
 Ronald Lopatni
 Miroslav Poljak
 Dejan Dabović
 Đorđe Perišić
 Mirko Sandić
 Zdravko Hebel

References

1968